Rafoogar (Rafu Gar, needle-worker, darner or a cloth mender, رفو گر) is an artisan similar to an embroiderer( who decorates the cloths), but the Rafoogar has the skill to repair the damaged or torn clothes. Rafoogar makes the holes, cuts, and manufacturing damages almost invisible. In Kashmir, the term is more associated with shawl making where the weavers were called Sada-baf  and the workman for repairing work called Rafoogar.

Rafoogiri 
Rafoogiri (Darning) is a traditional art; it consists of sewing, making the joints, looping, and repairing holes or worn areas in fabric using needles and thread (of base colors). Rafoogar is the person who mends torn clothing by matching the weave, making identical loops, creating rows of stitches, and sometimes by crossing and interweaving rows to compass a gap. Kashmiri Rafoogars are known as the best Rafoogars. There are other areas also where this craft is practiced for decades. For instance, the Bijnor district has been the hub of rafoogari.

Surgeons of cloths 
A specialist, Rafoogar, gives new life to defective material. Hence a Rafoogar makes the cloths more sustainable. Rafoogars are comparable to the surgeons as they doctor (repair) wrongly weaved or knitted cloths, and skill essentially needs a high degree of precision.

Rafoogar baithak 
Rafoogar baithak is an initiative in favor of the dying craft.

See also 
 Kashmiri handicrafts
 Darning
 Shawl

References 

Indian art
Handicrafts
Art occupations
Craft occupations
Embroidery